Aribinda Airport   is an airport serving the village of Aribinda in the Soum Province, part of the Sahel Region of Burkina Faso.

Airport is likely long abandoned. There is currently no paved or marked runway near any of six different coordinate pairs for Aribinda available on the internet. Neither is any historical or runway information posted at any web site with a page for Aribinda. However, a listing for the airfield still appears in the official ASECNA Aeronautical Information Publication for Burkina Faso, quoting coordinates N14 13.0 W000 53.0. Furthermore, the airport still has a valid 3-letter code allocated by IATA, though a search of the ICAO database reveals no 4-letter ICAO location indicator code.

References

External links
ASECNA AIP for Burkina Faso
IATA location code search
ICAO location indicator search
OurAirports
GCMap
FallingRain
Maplandia
WorldAirportCodes

Airports in Burkina Faso